Vaishali, Vesali or Vaiśālī was a city in present-day Bihar, India, and is now an archaeological site. It is a part of the Tirhut Division.

It was the capital city of the Vajjika League of Vrijji mahajanapada, considered one of the first examples of a republic around the 6th century BCE. Gautama Buddha  preached his last sermon before his death in c. 483 BCE, then in 383 BCE the Second Buddhist council was convened here by King Kalasoka, making it an important place in both Jain and Buddhist religions. It contains one of the best-preserved of the Pillars of Ashoka, topped by a single Asiatic lion.

Vaishali is also home to possibly the earliest known example of a stupa, the Buddha relic stupa which is said to contain the ashes of the Buddha.

The city finds mention in the travel accounts of Chinese explorers, Faxian (4th century CE) and Xuanzang (7th century CE), which were later used in 1861 by British archaeologist Alexander Cunningham to first identify Vaiśālī with the present village of Basarh in Vaishali District, Bihar.

Etymology
Vaishali derives its name from King Vishal of the Mahabharata age.

History

Even before the advent of Buddhism and Jainism, Vaiśālī was the capital of the  republican Licchavi state. In that period, Vaiśālī was an ancient metropolis and the capital city of the republic of the Vaiśālī state, which covered most of the Himalayan Gangetic region of present-day Bihar state, India. However, very little is known about the early history of Vaiśālī. The Vishnu Purana records 34 kings of Vaiśālī, the first being Nabhaga, who is believed to have abdicated his throne over a matter of human rights and believed to have declared: "I am now a free tiller of the soil, king over my acre."  The last among the 34 was Sumati, who is considered a contemporary of Dasaratha, father of the Hindu god, Lord Rama.

Vaiśālī is also renowned as the land of Amrapali, the great Indian courtesan, who appears in many folktales, as well as in Buddhist literature. Ambapali became a disciple of Buddha. Manudev was a famous king of the illustrious Lichchavi clan of the confederacy, who desired to possess Amrapali after he saw her dance performance in Vaishali.

A kilometer away is Abhishek Pushkarini, the coronation tank. The sacred waters of the tank anointed the elected representatives of Vaiśālī. Next to it stands the Japanese temple and the Vishwa Shanti Stupa (World Peace Pagoda) built by the Nipponzan Myohoji sect of Japan. A small part of the Buddha's relics found in Vaiśālī have been enshrined in the foundation and in the chhatra of the Stupa.

Near the coronation tank is Stupa 1 or the Relic Stupa. Here the Lichchavis reverentially encased one of the eight portions of the Master's relics, which they received after the Mahaparinirvana. After his last discourse the Awakened One set out for Kushinagar, but the Licchavis kept following him. Buddha gave them his alms bowl but they still refused to return. The Master created an illusion of a river in spate which compelled them to go back. This site can be identified with Deora in modern Kesariya village, where Ashoka later built a stupa. Ānanda, the personal attendant of the Buddha, attained Nirvana in the midst of the Ganges outside Vaiśālī.

Visits of the Buddha to Vaiśālī

Vaishali is well known for its close association with the Buddha. After leaving Kapilavastu for renunciation, Prince Siddhartha came to Vaishali first and undertook his initial spiritual training from Uddaka Rāmaputta (Rāmaputra Udraka) and Āḷāra Kālāma. After the Enlightenment the Buddha frequently visited Vaishali. He organized the sangha on the pattern of Vaishalian democracy. It was here that he first allowed females to join the sangha, initiating his maternal aunt Mahaprajapati Gautami into the order. His last Varshavasa (rainy season resort) was here and he announced his approaching Mahaparinirvana (the final departure from the world) just three months in advance. Before leaving for Kusinagara, where he died, he left his alms-bowl (Bhiksha-Patra) here with the people of Vaishali.

Jainism at Vaishali

The Svetambaras state that the final Tirthankara, Lord Mahavira, was born and raised in Kshatriyakund district, Vaiśālī to King Siddhartha. and Queen Trishala. According to Jain text Uttarapurāṇa, 
King Chetaka ruled as a Republican President in Vaishali and was a famous and complaisant king. He is mentioned as a staunch follower of Jainism. According to the text, Chetaka had ten sons and seven daughters. His sister Priyakarini (also known as Trishala) was married to Siddhartha. His daughter Chellana married Shrenik (also known as Bimbisara). As per Indologist Hermann Jacobi, Vardhaman Mahavira's mother Trishala was sister of King Chetaka.
Vaiśālī was also the residence of Kandaramasuka and Pātikaputta.

Notable Buddhist sites in Vaishali

Relic stupa
Near the coronation tank is Stupa 1 or the Relic Stupa. Here the Licchavis reverentially encased one of the eight portions of the Master's relics, which they received after the Mahaparinirvana. After his last discourse the Buddha set out for Kushinagar, but the Licchavis kept following him. The Buddha gave them his alms bowl but they still refused to return. He then created an illusion of a river in spate which compelled them to go back. This site can be identified with Deora in modern Kesariya village, where Ashoka later built a stupa.

As per recent research, the relic stupa is potentially one of the earliest archaeologically known stupas.

Kutagarasala Vihara
Kutagarasala Vihara is the monastery where Buddha most frequently stayed while visiting Vaiśālī. It is located 3 kilometres from the relic Stupa, and on its ground can be found the Ānanda Stupa, with an Asokan pillar in very good condition (perhaps the only complete Asokan pillar left standing), and an ancient pond.

Coronation Tank
A few hundred metres from the Relic Stupa is Abhishek Pushkarini, the coronation tank. The sacred waters of the tank anointed the elected representatives of Vaiśālī.

World Peace Pagoda

Next to the coronation tank stands the Japanese temple and the Viśvā Śānti Stūpa (World Peace Pagoda) built by the Japanese Nichiren Buddhist sect Nipponzan-Myōhōji. A small part of the Buddha's relics found in Vaiśālī have been enshrined in the foundation and in the chhatra of the Stupa.

The Vaishali Museum was established in 1971 by the Archaeological Survey of India to preserve and display the antiquities found during the  exploration of sites around ancient Vaishali.

Recent development
In February 2019, Chief Minister of Bihar Nitish Kumar laid the foundation stone of Buddha Samyak Darshan Museum and Memorial Stupa to house Buddha relics.
In September 2020, Prime Minister of India Narendra Modi inaugurated the Vaishali Railway station. This rail line now connects the city with Hajipur and Patna.

Historical figures from Vaishali

 Mahavira, the 24th Tirthankara of Jainism. Born into a royal kshatriya family in what is now Vaishali district of Bihar. He abandoned all worldly possessions at the age of 30 and became an ascetic. He is considered a slightly older contemporary of the Buddha.

 Chetaka, King and ruler of the Vajjika League which had its capital in Vaishali.

 Vimalakirti, the central figure of the Vimalakirti Sutra and a lay practitioner of Buddhism.

See also

Mithila (region)
Pillars of Ashoka
Chaumukhi Mahadev Mandir

References

Further reading

External links



Buddhist pilgrimage sites in India
Ancient Indian cities
Former populated places in India
History of Bihar
Archaeological sites in Bihar
Former capital cities in India
Buddhist sites in Bihar
Jain temples in Bihar
Hindu pilgrimage sites in India
Hindu holy cities
Mauryan art
Edicts of Ashoka
Indo-Aryan archaeological sites
Vaishali district